Southern Skies LLC is a former American aircraft manufacturer based in Taylorsville, North Carolina. The company specialized in the design and manufacture of paramotors in the late 1990s, but no longer produces its own aircraft. The company remains in business as a flight training school and dealer for German Fresh Breeze paramotors.

The company produced the first four-stroke powered paramotor ever built, the Quattro. The Quattro design used a computer-controlled, electronic ignition system-equipped, Honda Kart engine.

Aircraft

References

External links

Defunct aircraft manufacturers of the United States
Paramotors
Companies based in North Carolina
Alexander County, North Carolina